Huayin is a county-level city in Weinan, Shaanxi province, China.  Prior to 1990, Huayin was regarded as a county.  Huayin literally means 'to the north of Mount Hua', because it is to the north of that mountain.

Administrative divisions
As 2019, Huayin City is divided to 2 subdistricts, 4 towns and 1 other.
Subdistricts
 Taihualu Subdistrict 
 Yuemiao Subdistrict (

Towns

Others
 State-owned Shaanxi Huashan Enterprise Companyown

Climate

References

 
Cities in Shaanxi